is a subway station on the Tokyo Metro Yūrakuchō Line in Chiyoda, Tokyo, Japan, operated by the Tokyo subway operator Tokyo Metro. It is numbered Y-17.

Lines
Through services operate to and from the Tobu Tojo Line and Seibu Ikebukuro Line.

Station layout

The station consists of an island platform located on the second basement ("B2F") level, serving two tracks.

Platforms

History
The station opened on 30 October 1974.

Passenger statistics
In fiscal 2013, the station was the least used on the Yūrakuchō line and the 128th busiest on the Tokyo Metro network with an average of 13,566 passengers daily.

Surrounding area
 Imperial Palace
 Sakurada Gate
 Tokyo Metropolitan Police Department - "Sakurada Gate" is also synonymous with the Police Agency.
 National Diet Building
 Kasumigaseki Station ( Tokyo Metro Marunouchi Line,  Tokyo Metro Hibiya Line,  Tokyo Metro Chiyoda Line)

References

External links

 Sakuradamon Station information (Tokyo Metro) 

Stations of Tokyo Metro
Tokyo Metro Yurakucho Line
Railway stations in Tokyo
Railway stations in Japan opened in 1974